Gisela Dulko and Květa Peschke were the defending champions, but competed this year with different partners. Dulko teamed up with Michaëlla Krajicek and lost in first round to Eleni Daniilidou and Jasmin Wöhr. Peschke teamed up with Francesca Schiavone, but the pair withdrew before their semifinal match against Corina Morariu and Katarina Srebotnik, as Schiavone had injured her right knee.

Lisa Raymond and Samantha Stosur won the title, defeating Morariu and Srebotnik in the final 6–3, 6–0.

Seeds

Draw

Draw

References
 Main and Qualifying Draws

Generali Ladies Linz - Doubles